Aleksey Nikolayevich Voyevodin (born August 9, 1970 near Penza) is a Russian race walker mainly competing over the 50 km distance. He has one World Championships silver medal, and won a bronze medal at the 2004 Summer Olympics.

On August 5, 2008, Voyevodin and training partners Sergey Morozov, Viktor Burayev, and Vladimir Kanaykin, all coached by Viktor Chegin, were banned from competition, following a positive EPO test. The positive tests were conducted in April 2008 and evidenced systematic doping.

Since 1992, Voyevodin is studying at the Penza State University's Faculty of Institute of Physical Education

International competitions

See also
List of doping cases in athletics

References

 

1970 births
Living people
Sportspeople from Penza
Penza State University alumni
Russian male racewalkers
Olympic male racewalkers
Olympic athletes of Russia
Olympic bronze medalists for Russia
Olympic bronze medalists in athletics (track and field)
Athletes (track and field) at the 2004 Summer Olympics
Medalists at the 2004 Summer Olympics
World Athletics Championships athletes for Russia
World Athletics Championships medalists
World Athletics Race Walking Team Championships winners
European Athletics Championships medalists
Russian Athletics Championships winners
Doping cases in athletics
Russian sportspeople in doping cases